The Baluchi mouse-like hamster (Calomyscus baluchi) is a species of rodent in the family Calomyscidae.
It is found in Afghanistan and Pakistan.

References

Mouse-like hamsters
Mammals of Afghanistan
Mammals of Pakistan
Mammals described in 1920
Taxa named by Oldfield Thomas
Balochistan
Taxonomy articles created by Polbot